The Seventh Van Cliburn International Piano Competition took place in Fort Worth, Texas from May 18 to June 2, 1985. Brazilian pianist José Feghali won the competition, while Philippe Bianconi and Barry Douglas were awarded the Silver and bronze medals.

John Corigliano composed his Fantasia on an Ostinato for the competition.

Jurors

  John Giordano (chairman)
  İdil Biret
  Jorge Bolet
  Anton Dikov
  Malcolm Frager
  Arpad Joó
  Lili Kraus
  Ming-Qiang Li
  Minoru Nojima
  Cécile Ousset
  Harold C. Schonberg
  Soulima Stravinsky
  Wolfgang Stresemann

Results

References

Van Cliburn International Piano Competition